Cigole is a comune in the province of Brescia, in Lombardy.

References

Cities and towns in Lombardy